Fu Qian (died late 263) was a military general of the state of Shu Han in the Three Kingdoms period of China. He was a son of Fu Rong.

Life
Fu Qian was from Yiyang commandery, which is in present-day Xinyang, Henan. His father, Fu Rong, was killed in action during the Battle of Xiaoting in 222 against Sun Quan's forces. Fu Qian inherited his father's official position and served Shu as General of the Household of the Left (左中郎將), before being promoted to Area Commander (都督) of Guanzhong.

In late 263, during the campaign on Shu by the rival state of Cao Wei, Fu Qian was sent into battle to resist the enemy. At that time, many people praised Fu Qian and his father as "loyal and righteous for over generations" (奕世忠義). Fu Qian was tasked to defend Yangping Pass while Jiang Shu (蔣舒) was sent to engage the enemy. However, Jiang Shu surrendered to the enemy by opening the gates and letting them in. The Wei general Hu Lie (胡烈) led his troops to attack Fu Qian's position. Fu Qian was eventually killed in the futile attempt to drive out the enemy.

In Romance of the Three Kingdoms
In the 14th-century historical novel Romance of the Three Kingdoms, Fu Qian was a trusted general serving under Jiang Wei. Following an attack by Wei forces at Yangping Pass, Fu Qian defended it with his greatest of skills. However, Fu Qian's comrade Jiang Shu (蔣舒) eventually surrendered, and this led to Fu Qian's death in the midst of combat.

See also
 Lists of people of the Three Kingdoms

References

 Chen, Shou (3rd century). Records of the Three Kingdoms (Sanguozhi).
 Luo, Guanzhong (14th century). Romance of the Three Kingdoms (Sanguo Yanyi).

Year of birth unknown
263 deaths
Shu Han generals
Three Kingdoms people killed in battle